Camponotus dryandrae is a species of ant in the genus Camponotus. Described by McArthur in 1996, the species is restricted to Western Australia.

See also
List of ants of Australia
List of Camponotus species''

References

dryandrae
Hymenoptera of Australia
Insects described in 1996